The John F. Schmerschall House is a house located in Jerome, Idaho that was listed on the National Register of Historic Places in 1983.  It was built in 1917 by master stonemason H.T. Pugh.

See also

 List of National Historic Landmarks in Idaho
 National Register of Historic Places listings in Jerome County, Idaho

References

1917 establishments in Idaho
Colonial architecture in the United States
Bungalow architecture in Idaho
Houses completed in 1917
Houses in Jerome County, Idaho
Houses on the National Register of Historic Places in Idaho
National Register of Historic Places in Jerome County, Idaho